Purman is an unincorporated community in Ripley County, in the U.S. state of Missouri.

History
A post office called Purman was established in 1901, and remained in operation until 1913. The community has the name of one Mr. Purman, a pioneer citizen.

References

Unincorporated communities in Ripley County, Missouri
Unincorporated communities in Missouri